The 1964 Motocross World Championship was the 8th edition of the Motocross World Championship organized by the FIM and reserved for 500cc and 250cc motorcycles.

Summary
Jeff Smith riding for the BSA factory racing team won the 500cc motocross world championship to become the first British rider to claim the premier division, beating out former two-time world champions and Husqvarna teammates Rolf Tibblin and Sten Lundin. Tibblin won the first four races of the year before Smith won seven of the final ten events to capture the title.

In the 250cc division, 20-year-old privateer, Joël Robert rode a ČZ to win 9 of the 14 Grand Prix races to claim the world championship ahead of the defending champion, Torsten Hallman. Robert became the youngest motocross world champion at the time.

Grands Prix

500cc

250cc

Final standings

Points are awarded to the top 6 classified finishers.

500cc

250cc

Notes

References

Motocross World Championship seasons
Motocross World Championship